T. N. Srinivasan, in full Thirukodikaval Nilakanta Srinivasan (27 March 1933 – 11 November 2018), was an Indian economist who had taught and worked in the United States.  He was the Emeritus Samuel C. Park, Jr. Professor of Economics at Yale University.  He was formerly chairman of the department of economics. He was a special adviser to the Development Research Center at the World Bank from 1977 to 1980, and taught at numerous academic institutions for over four decades, including MIT, Stanford University, and the Indian Statistical Institute.  In 2007, he received a Padma Bhushan decoration from the President of India for his contributions to Literature and Education.

He earned his Ph.D. in Economics (1962) from Yale University, M.A. in Mathematics (1954) from University of Madras, India and B.A. (Honors) Mathematics 1953 from University of Madras, India. He did his Professional Training in Statistics (1953-1955) at Indian Statistical Institute, Calcutta. He has made important contributions in the fields of economic growth and development economics, and international trade. He had been very active in policy debates concerning India. He was also the founding co-editor of the Journal of Development Economics.

He was visiting fellow at the Center for Research on Economic Development and Policy Reform, Stanford University; fellow of the Econometric Society, American Academy of Arts and Sciences, and American Philosophical Society; and a foreign associate of the National Academy of Sciences of the US.  He has authored a prolific collection of books and articles on econometrics, world trade, and developing country economics.T.N. Srinivasan Yale University Faculty page 'India must speed up reforms for fast growth'

Selected bibliography

Books

References 

1933 births
2018 deaths
20th-century Indian economists
Foreign associates of the National Academy of Sciences
Fellows of the Econometric Society
Recipients of the Padma Bhushan in literature & education
Yale University alumni
Yale University faculty
Scientists from Tamil Nadu
Distinguished Fellows of the American Economic Association
Indian emigrants to the United States